Katharine Bard (October 19, 1916 – July 28, 1983) was an American actress. She appeared in the films The Decks Ran Red, The Interns, Johnny Cool, Inside Daisy Clover and How to Save a Marriage and Ruin Your Life. She appeared in the television series' Suspense, Lux Video Theatre, The Millionaire, Studio One, Front Row Center, Studio 57, Goodyear Theatre, M Squad, Climax!, Alfred Hitchcock Presents, Gunsmoke, The Rifleman, Perry Mason, Peter Gunn, Playhouse 90, Sam Benedict, Alcoa Premiere, The Great Adventure, The Farmer's Daughter, The F.B.I., The Big Valley and Insight, among others.

In 1947-48 she appeared as the title character in the syndicated version of the radio series Claudia.

Filmography

References

External links
 

1916 births
1983 deaths
People from Highland Park, Illinois
Actresses from Illinois
20th-century American actresses
American film actresses